Bible Hill is an unincorporated community in Decatur County, Tennessee, United States. Bible Hill is located north of Parsons.

References

Unincorporated communities in Decatur County, Tennessee
Unincorporated communities in Tennessee